Ajit Kumar Panja (13 September 1936 – 14 November 2008) was a Union minister of state in the Government of India. He was a member of Indian National Congress party but left it to join Trinamool Congress. He was born in Calcutta, and studied law at the Scottish Church College, Calcutta and at the Lincoln's Inn. His Native village was a small village in Burdwan district, named Majigram. A lawyer by profession, he authored many books. He was also a stage actor who enacted the role of Ramakrishna Paramahansa in Kolkata.

Life and career
Ajit Kumar Panja was born in Kolkata on 13 September 1936. His father was Dhanapati Panja.

Apart from political career he started performing on stage theatre in the role of "Sri Ramakrishma Paramhansa" in the play "Sri Sri Ramakrishna" (made according to the story of Noti Binodini written by Late.  Brajendra Kishore Dey) organised by Kolkata High Court Advocate's Drama Association in India. The play was staged in London and USA (Washington, Chicago, New York and Los Angeles).

Ajit Panja died of oral cancer on 14 November 2008 at the Peerless Hospital.

Positions held

1971,1972-77		Member, West Bengal Legislative Assembly and 1982–84
1971-72			Cabinet Minister, Judiciary and Parliamentary Affairs (Home), West Bengal
1972-77			Cabinet Minister, Health and Family Planning and Water Supply,			
1973			Member, All India Congress Committee (A.I.C.C.)
1977			President, District Congress Committee (D.C.C.) (I), North Calcutta, West Bengal
1980-81			President, Pradesh Congress Committee (P.C.C.)(I), West Bengal
1984			Elected to 8th Lok Sabha
1985-86			Union Minister of State, Planning
1986			Union Minister of State, Food and Civil Supplies
1986-88			Union Minister of State, Information and Broadcasting (Independent Charge)
1988-89			Union Minister of State, Finance
1989			Re-elected to 9th Lok Sabha (2nd term)
1990			Member, Committee of Privileges Member, Consultative Committee,			Ministry of Finance
1990-91			Member, Committee on Public Accounts Member, Informal Consultative
			Committee, Railway Zone
1991			Re-elected to 10th Lok Sabha (3rd term)
1991-93			Union Minister of State, Information and Broadcasting (Independent Charge)
1993-95			Union Minister of State, Coal (Independent Charge)
1996			Re-elected to 11th Lok Sabha (4th term)
1996-97			Member, Committee on Energy Member, Business Advisory Committee
1998			Re-elected to 12th Lok Sabha (5th term) Chief Whip, West Bengal Trinamool Congress Parliamentary Party
1998-99			Member, Committee on Industry Member, Consultative Committee, Ministry of
			Urban Affairs and Employment Chairman, West Bengal Trinamool Congress
1999			Re-elected to 13th Lok Sabha (6th term)
13 Oct 1999 to 2004		Union Minister of State, External Affairs

Books published

Encephalitis Attack in West Bengal
CPM Gun Shoot to Kill (English and Bengali)
Ganatantra Hatya (Bengali)
Siksha Khethre Nairajya (Bengali)
Sansad Bichitra (Bengali)
PM (Sh. V.P. Singh) challenged to prove charges (English)
Dunkel Agreement (Bengali)
Unemployment Problems in India How to solve it (Bengali)
Era of Excellence of Narasimha Rao Govt 4th Yr-Major Achievements and Decisions
Mining Medicines Hand Book for Health Workers and Mine Workers

References

External links
Ajit Panja

Scottish Church College alumni
University of Calcutta alumni
Members of Lincoln's Inn
Deaths from cancer in India
Deaths from oral cancer
1936 births
2008 deaths
Politicians from Kolkata
India MPs 1984–1989
India MPs 1989–1991
India MPs 1991–1996
India MPs 1996–1997
India MPs 1998–1999
India MPs 1999–2004
West Bengal MLAs 1971–1972
West Bengal MLAs 1972–1977
West Bengal MLAs 1982–1987
Trinamool Congress politicians from West Bengal
Lok Sabha members from West Bengal
State cabinet ministers of West Bengal
Ministers for Information and Broadcasting of India
Indian National Congress politicians from West Bengal